John Mulrooney (24 August 1934 – 16 February 2017) was an Australian rules footballer who played with St Kilda in the Victorian Football League (VFL).

Notes

External links 

1934 births
Australian rules footballers from Victoria (Australia)
St Kilda Football Club players
Golden Point Football Club players
2017 deaths